The 2022 European Junior Judo Championships was held at the UNYP Arena in Prague, Czech Republic, from 15 to 18 September 2022. The final day of competition featured a mixed team event.

Schedule & event videos
The event aired on the EJU YouTube channel. The draw was held on 14 September at 16:00. All times are local (UTC+2).

Medal summary

Men's events

Women's events

Source Results

Mixed

Medal table

References

External links
 

European Junior Judo Championships
U21
European Championships, U21
Judo
Judo in the Czech Republic
Judo
Judo